Lucas González Vélez (born 7 June 1981) is a Colombian football coach, currently in charge of Águilas Doradas.

Career
Born in Bogotá, González started working as a fitness coach before moving to Australia and Spain. In 2017, he joined CE Sabadell FC as a methodology director, after his company Global Football Institute established a partnership with the club; he left in January 2019, as the partnership ended.

In August 2019, González moved to CF Igualada as a fitness and assistant coach. In February 2021, he returned to his home country after being named manager of the under-17 squad of Atlético Nacional.

On 5 August 2022, González left Atlético Nacional, and was announced as Harold Rivera's assistant at Independiente Santa Fe on 23 December. Seven days later, however, he was appointed manager of Águilas Doradas Rionegro in the top tier.

References

1981 births
Living people
Colombian football managers
Águilas Doradas Rionegro managers
Colombian expatriates in Australia
Colombian expatriate sportspeople in Spain